Qostin Rud (also Romanized as Qosţīn Rūd) is a village in Rudbar-e Mohammad-e Zamani Rural District, Alamut-e Gharbi District, Qazvin County, Qazvin Province, Iran. At the 2006 census, its population was 89, in 30 families.

References 

Populated places in Qazvin County